U.S. Route 209 (US 209) is a  long U.S. Highway in the states of Pennsylvania and New York. Although the route is a spur of US 9, US 209 never intersects US 9, coming within five miles of the route and making the short connection via New York State Route 199 (NY 199). The southern terminus of the route is at Pennsylvania Route 147 (PA 147) in Millersburg, Pennsylvania. The northern terminus is at US 9W north of Kingston in Ulster, New York, where the road continues east as NY 199.

In Pennsylvania, the highway travels through the length of the Delaware Water Gap National Recreation Area, along the southern part of the Pocono Mountains in Monroe and Carbon counties (through Jim Thorpe and along parts of the defunct historic Lehigh Canal and Lehigh Valley Railroad) then over the divide near Nesquehoning into the Schuylkill Valley (along Panther Creek). Similarly, for part of its route in New York, US 209 runs alongside the defunct Delaware and Hudson Canal, which ran from Port Jervis to Kingston, in each case, following the old land road connections connecting the Anthracite fields of Northeastern Pennsylvania with the industries and heating customers in New York City.

US 209 is one of the original highways in the 1926 U.S. Highway System plan. The route was initially an intrastate highway contained entirely within Pennsylvania. It began at an intersection with US 11 (now US 22 / US 322) in Clarks Ferry (east of Duncannon) and ended at US 6 in Milford. US 209 was extended northward to US 9W in Kingston, New York, in April 1935 and truncated to Millersburg, Pennsylvania, by 1938. The portion of US 209 in New York north of Port Jervis was previously designated as US 6 from 1926 to 1928, U.S. Route 6N from 1928 to 1933, and New York State Route 279 from 1933 to 1935.

US 209 was realigned onto limited-access highways in two locations along its routing during the 1950s. The first is in the Stroudsburg, Pennsylvania, area. Originally just a bypass of Stroudsburg, a portion of this expressway is now also part of Interstate 80 (I-80) while another portion is now also part of PA 33, with the southern end and the portion between I-80 and PA 33 still just US 209. The second is in the Kingston, New York, area. Serving as a bypass of Kingston that connects to the Kingston-Rhinecliff Bridge, the highway begins west of Kingston along US 209 south of NY 28 in the town of Ulster and ends north of Kingston, at a cloverleaf interchange with US 9W and NY 199, still in the town of Ulster. This also serves as the current northern terminus of US 209, replacing the old terminus at US 9W in Downtown Kingston. When the expressways were finished, US 209's former routing through downtown Stroudsburg was redesignated as US 209 Business, and NY 28 was extended over US 209’s former alignment through downtown Kingston.

Route description 

|-
|PA || 150.60 || 242.37
|-
|NY || 61.14 || 98.40
|-
|Total || 211.74 || 340.76
|}

Although signed as a north–south route in both states for its entire length, US 209 actually runs closer to east–west along its southern sections in Pennsylvania, only gently trending northward. Only at Stroudsburg does it begin to turn more to the north as it begins to follow the Delaware River. In New York it runs almost due northeast for its entire length.

Much of the highway in both states is a two-lane road, running through narrow mountain valleys, but there are expressway portions. In Pennsylvania, one near Stroudsburg connects concurrencies with PA 33 and Interstate 80 (I-80); in New York, the north end is an expressway.

Millersburg to Jim Thorpe 

From the southern terminus at PA 147 in Millersburg, US 209 runs alongside the Berry Mountain ridge through the Lykens Valley in northern Dauphin County, a rural valley that is home to an Amish community. In the Lykens Valley, the route passes through Elizabethville before continuing east through Lykens and Williamstown. The road continues into Schuylkill County, finally climbing a valley headwall near Tower City to intersect I-81 on the other side, then continues on to Tremont. Beyond that, the generally straight route starts to curve a little more frequently into Pottsville, after which it follows the upper Schuylkill River as it heads into lightly populated areas in the Coal Region such as Port Carbon, Cumbola, New Philadelphia, and Middleport on its way to Tamaqua.

Several miles beyond, US 209 crosses into Carbon County at Lansford, where it nestles between Nesquehoning, Sharp, and Pisgah mountains until it finally turns slightly to the north just before Nesquehoning. From there it follows the Nesquehoning Creek valley down to the Lehigh River, which US 209 follows southeasterly through Jim Thorpe to Lehighton. At the south end of the town, it crosses the river and resumes its north-trending eastward course, which brings it to an interchange at I-476 (Pennsylvania Turnpike Northeast Extension).

Jim Thorpe to Matamoras 

Once again, there are no major settlements along US 209 as it heads through isolated valleys, this time with more agricultural use evident, into Monroe County and eventually to its absorption into PA 33. US 209 Bus. leaves the road at Sciota for travelers wishing to bypass the expressway.

At the next exit, US 209 takes its own short branch of expressway several miles to I-80 just outside Stroudsburg. It stays with the Interstate through the borough and neighboring East Stroudsburg from exits 304 to 309, one of the last exits before the state line.

From this point on, US 209 runs much more northerly, reconnecting with US 209 Bus. after several miles and taking its more firmly northeast bearing to eventually run along the Delaware River shortly after entering Pike County, its last in the state. This  segment provides access to New Jersey via toll bridges at Dingman's Bridge and Milford Crossing, where US 206 comes to its northern end. Just beyond the latter bridge, the road reaches Milford, where US 6 joins it.

The two highways eventually start to run alongside I-84, and development picks up as they approach Matamoras, the easternmost town in the state. After crossing under the interstate at its final Pennsylvania interchange, they form the borough's main street along Pennsylvania Avenue and cross into New York via the Mid-Delaware Bridge.

Mid-Delaware Bridge to Kingston 
US 6 and US 209 remain concurrent as they enter Port Jervis, but after less than a mile US 209 strikes out to the northeast again on its own. After leaving the city, it enters the valley between the Shawangunk Ridge and the Catskill Plateau to its west, following the Neversink River until crossing it just prior to the hamlet of Cuddebackville. The scenery is rural and the settlements along the road are few, with only one blinker between Port Jervis and the Sullivan County line. In Wurtsboro, shortly after the NY 17 (future I-86) interchange, the route reaches a traffic light at Sullivan Street.

The road follows along some of the old Delaware and Hudson Canal, a National Historic Landmark and passes Wurtsboro Airport, out of the county into Ulster County, and eventually reaches another village, more bustling Ellenville. Just past it, in the hamlet of Napanoch, it picks up its first concurrency partner since US 6, NY 55. These two routes run together as Rondout Creek crosses and eventually runs alongside the road.

At another small hamlet, Kerhonkson, NY 55 leaves to join US 44 at the latter's western terminus. US 44 and NY 55 offer access ultimately to Poughkeepsie,  to the east. The valley begins to widen as another road, NY 213, joins for a mile before leaving at a blinker in downtown Stone Ridge. To the north, the road eventually widens into four lanes, then four divided lanes as the freeway begins just short of NY 28 just west of Kingston, just inside the Catskill Park.

After turning to the east again, US 209 crosses the New York State Thruway (I-87) but does not have an exit. The eastbound highway remains an expressway to the Kingston–Rhinecliff Bridge. US 209, however, does not make it that far, becoming NY 199 where it crosses over US 9W.

History 
US 209 follows a straight, northeasterly course for almost its entire length within New York. This corridor, first used for long-distance transport by the Old Mine Road in colonial times and then the historic Delaware and Hudson Canal in the early 19th century, keeps it in the scenic valley between the Catskill Plateau and the Shawangunk Ridge. Except for the expressway at the northern end—the remnant of a much more ambitious plan to make the entire roadway one—US 209 remains a two-lane rural road for much of its length in the state. The small communities along it are separated by great distances, and the road is a vital access link.

Pennsylvania 
Before the advent of the U.S. Highway System, the alignment of US 209 in Pennsylvania carried several designations. By 1920, the Gap Way was signed to run from Philadelphia to East Stroudsburg, where it met the modern alignment of U.S. 209, running along that road to the New York border. On May 31, 1911, as part of the Sproul Road Bill, the highway was assigned several Legislative Route numbers, each corresponding to a specific section of what would become US 209. The segment of the route from Duncannon north to Millersburg was part of Legislative Route 1. From Millersburg east to Pottsville, the highway was referenced as LR 199. Between Pottsville and Lehighton, the road carried LR 162. The section connecting Lehighton to Stroudsburg was given LR 164. Lastly, the segment from Stroudsburg to Milford was designated LR 167. The future US 6 / US 209 concurrency between Milford and the state line carried LR 8.

The Pennsylvania portion of US 209 dates back to the formation of the U.S. Highway System in 1926. At the time, US 209 began at US 11 (today US 22 / US 322) east of Duncannon and ended at US 6 in Milford. Northeast of Milford, US 6 continued alone to Matamoras and across the Delaware River into New York. Between Duncannon and Millersburg, US 209 was routed along the eastern banks of the Susquehanna River on what is now PA 147. In the Poconos, US 209 ran along the modern US 209 Business. US 209 was extended northward to Kingston, New York, creating an overlap with US 6 from Milford to the state line. Meanwhile, US 209 was truncated by 1938 to end in Millersburg while the former routing of US 209 from Clarks Ferry to Millersburg became part of an extended US 15.

In the summer of 1962, the routing of US 209 was altered in the vicinity of Stroudsburg. At what is now the interchange between US 209 and US 209 Business, US 209 broke from its previous alignment and continued east to a newly built freeway (modern PA 33). PA 115, which was concurrent with US 209 from Brodheadsville to the freeway, continued south on the expressway while US 209 proceeded north. At the present-day split between PA 33 and US 209, US 209 followed the east fork, leaving the west fork with no designation. US 209 then followed its current alignment around Stroudsburg, running concurrent to I-80 from exit 46A to exit 52 (now exits 304 and 309, respectively). It left I-80 at exit 52 and rejoined its previous alignment northeast of the borough. The old alignment through the borough was redesignated as US 209 Business. Part of US 209's new alignment east of Stroudsburg was previously part of PA 402. By 1972, PA 115 was truncated to Brodheadsville and the length of the north–south freeway near Stroudsburg was designated PA 33, overlapping US 209 for roughly two miles.

The National Park Service began the rule of no trucks along the Delaware Water Gap National Recreation Area on US 209 in August 1983. The bill was passed by President Ronald Reagan on the 1st of the month. It was projected to begin in April 1983, but the bill was delayed 180 days. In 1995, commercial vehicles began running in the area again, as long as they pay fee at two toll booths, one in Bushkill and one just south of downtown Milford. Prices began in 1995 and charged from $3.00 for 2-axles to $18.00 for 5 or more axles.

In 2011, after rains from Hurricane Irene in August and Tropical Storm Lee in September, the grounds under the highway were saturated and after a landslide occurred on October 21, the National Park Service closed US 209 between PA 739 in Dingmans Ferry and the North Contact Station just south of the Milford–Montague Toll Bridge. Due to the approach of winter, the National Park Service can only get engineering done with outside contractors. The detour set in place takes motorists across the Dingmans Ferry Bridge and Old Mine Road or via PA 739 and State Route 2001 (Milford Road) to access Milford.  Delaware Township has asked the Pennsylvania Department of Transportation (PennDOT) to keep PA 739 near US 209 clear of snow, due to the importance of the intersection. US 209, however, was slated to be closed through the winter and likely into summer of 2012. The project was then slated to be finished in fall 2012, a delay from the original spring/summer repair.

The project was completed on November 21, 2012 and US 209 was re-opened to traffic. With the construction, new guard rails were instituted and the road was stabilized and repaved. The reconstruction of the McDade Recreational Trail was slated for completion in spring 2013.

There are plans to construct two roundabouts along US 209 in Brodheadsville - one at Pleasant Valley Lane and the other at PA 115 - in order to alleviate traffic congestion. Construction on the roundabouts is projected to cost $11.5 million. In February 2021, PennDOT opened construction bids for the proposed roundabouts.

Marshalls Creek Bypass 

The junction where US 209 intersects with PA 402 in the hamlet of Marshalls Creek (within Middle Smithfield Township) was plagued with traffic for several decades. In 1990, studies were launched to investigate construction of a new bypass of the hamlet. The new bypass was approved in October 2004 and was originally projected to cost $70 million (2004 USD). The bypass was designed to be  in length and have an asphalt surface. Nine new signalized intersections were proposed for the bypass construction: seven on US 209, one on PA 402, and one on River Road. The first of three phases of construction was completed in mid-2007 and cost $14.2 million. Phase two, which was projected to start in fall of 2007, was originally projected to cost $17 million for constructing a new 400-space park and ride lot on US 209 and relocating Oak Grove Drive and Mount Nebo Roads, was completed in 2009 at only a cost of $6.3 million.

The third stage of construction of the bypass was originally projected to be completed in late 2012, but opened on June 11, 2012 with a ribbon cutting ceremony. With the opening, US 209 was realigned onto the new bypass, US 209 Business was extended from Seven Bridges Road to the new US 209 interchange east of Marshalls Creek and old US 209 along Seven Bridges Road was renumbered to State Route 1019 (SR 1019). Upon opening, Seven Bridges Road was closed for two to three months for bridge replacement, while the junction with US 209 Business was reconstructed. That portion of the project was slated for completion in early 2013, with a final stage three cost of $18.2 million.

New York 

Before the designation of the New York highway system, what is now US 209 was part of the Gap Way, which ran from the Pennsylvania border at Port Jervis to Kingston. In the mid-1920s, a highway connecting PA 7 at Port Jervis to NY 10 (now US 9W) in Kingston via Wurtsboro and Napanoch was designated as NY 50. In 1927, the first official route log published by AASHO included the NY 50 alignment as part of US 6. A year later, AASHO modified the definition of US 6, placing the route along a new alignment farther south in the state. In turn, the Port Jervis–Kingston highway was redesignated US 6N. The designation remained in place until 1933, when it was removed. The former US 6N was then redesignated as NY 279. The road changed designations for the final time in April 1935, rejoining the U.S. Highway System and becoming part of an extended US 209.

The portion of US 209 south of Kingston has remained virtually unchanged, with the exception of local realignments. Two such reroutings were in the vicinity of the hamlets of Spring Glen and Napanoch, where US 209 was initially routed on Phillipsport Road and Main Street, respectively. US 209 was realigned to bypass Napanoch , by which time construction had begun on a bypass of Spring Glen. It was opened to traffic by 1964.

US 209 initially entered Kingston on what is now Old Route 209 and Hurley Avenue. Within the city, the route followed North Front Street, and Clinton, Albany, and Ulster Avenues to a terminus at East Chester Street (US 9W). At the time, US 209 had an overlap with NY 32 from Broadway to Flatbush Avenue. Construction began in the early 1960s on a new limited-access highway bypassing downtown Kingston to the northwest. The highway began at US 209 south of Hurley and ended at an interchange with US 9W north of Kingston and south of Lake Katrine, where it met the western terminus of NY 199. The new route was completed by 1964 and became a realignment of US 209.

Future
Due to increasing suburbanization and a rapidly increasing population in the Stroudsburg area, I-80 is to be widened to three lanes in each direction from its current two between I-380 (exit 293) in Pocono Pines and the Delaware Water Gap Bridge (New Jersey state line), and part of this project includes the entirety of US 209’s concurrency with I-80. The project had a completion date of 2023, has been approved by PennDOT and USDOT and is in the final design phase. The project will widen I-80 to three lanes in each direction between exit 298 and exit 308, as well as reconstruct all interchanges included in this part of the project. This section of road was built in the 1920s and is one of the oldest stretches of the US highway in the US, starting out as a simple bypass of Stroudsburg for US 209 before becoming part of I-80. It has one of the highest accident rates in Pennsylvania due to major issues such as most entrances not having acceleration lanes, multiple overpasses that are structurally deficient, and shoulders that are as narrow as one tenth the required length for Interstate highways. Exits 304 and 305 on the westbound side are close together that they are only a quarter of the length apart required between exits, according to Interstate standards. Exits 303, 304, and 306 all do not provide full access. US 209 is a designated route, so all lanes had to be open during construction. In addition, this stretch of highway has large local usage, with 100% of drivers that enter at exit 307 getting off at either exit 306, exit 305 or exit 304, some of the current connections must be preserved to prevent local opposition.

The details of the project include widening I-80 to three lanes in each direction between exit 298 and exit 308 and rebuilding exits 298, 299, 303, 306, 307, and 308 to create full access between US 209, I-80 and PA 611. Exits 307 and 308 will both be reconstructed.

Major intersections

Special routes 
US 209 has four special bannered routes, all of which are located in Pennsylvania.

Truck routes

Pottsville–Tamaqua truck route 

U.S. Route 209 Truck (US 209 Truck) is a truck route of US 209 that bypasses a weight-restricted bridge over the Wabash Creek in Tamaqua, Pennsylvania, on which trucks over 28 tons are prohibited. The route follows PA 61, I-81, PA 54, and PA 309.

Major intersections

Kresgeville–Brodheadsville truck route 

U.S. Route 209 Truck (US 209 Truck) is a truck route of US 209 that bypasses a weight-restricted bridge over the Middle Creek in Kresgeville, Pennsylvania, on which trucks over 25 tons and combination loads over 38 tons are prohibited. The route follows PA 534, PA 903, and PA 115.

Major intersections

East Stroudsburg–Marshalls Creek truck route 

U.S. Route 209 Truck (US 209 Truck) is a truck route of US 209 that bypasses a weight-restricted bridge over the Marshall Creek in Smithfield Township, Pennsylvania, on which trucks over 35 tons and combination loads over 40 tons are prohibited. The route follows PA 447 and US 209 Bus.

Major intersections

Business routes

Stroudsburg business route 

U.S. Route 209 Business (US 209 Bus.) is a business route of US 209 in eastern Pennsylvania. The southern terminus of the route is at US 209 in the Hamilton Township hamlet of Sciota. The northern terminus is at US 209 in the Smithfield Township hamlet of Marshalls Creek.

US 209 Bus. follows the pre-1962 alignment of US 209 before it was moved onto I-80 between Marshalls Creek and present-day I-80 exit 305 in Stroudsburg, allowing US 209 Bus. to occupy the former alignment of US 209. In 1963, the Pennsylvania Highways Department recommended that US 209 Bus. be designated on the bypassed section of US 209 between Stroudsburg and Sciota. US 209 Bus. was extended southward to its current southern terminus in 1964 when US 209 was relocated onto a bypass paralleling its former alignment between Stroudsburg and Sciota. In 1974, the portion of this bypass from the mile-long connecting freeway to what was PA 611 up to exit 305 became designated as Interstate 80—the Interstate and US 209 run concurrently today between Stroudsburg and East Stroudsburg.

Major intersections

See also 
 List of county routes in Ulster County, New York

References

External links 

Pennsylvania Highways: US 209

US 209 in Pennsylvania at AARoads.com
Pennsylvania Roads - US 209
New York Roads - US 209
Mile by Mile travel guide
 Endpoints of US 209 at USEnds.com

2
Limited-access roads in New York (state)
Roads in the Harrisburg, Pennsylvania area
Transportation in Dauphin County, Pennsylvania
Transportation in Schuylkill County, Pennsylvania
Transportation in Carbon County, Pennsylvania
Transportation in Monroe County, Pennsylvania
Transportation in Pike County, Pennsylvania
Transportation in Orange County, New York
Transportation in Sullivan County, New York
Transportation in Ulster County, New York
09-2
09-2
09-2